Blood is a Channel 5 and Virgin Media One psychological thriller, created by Sophie Petzal and starring Carolina Main and Adrian Dunbar. The first series was broadcast in November 2018; the second series in April–May 2020.

Synopsis
Cat Hogan (Carolina Main) returns home to a fictional small town in the Dublin commuter belt (actually filmed in the Kilcock, Kildare) following the news that her mother, who had been suffering from a long illness, has died after falling over and striking her head against a rock at the family home.  Haunted by flashbacks from an incident in her childhood, she's convinced her father had something to do with her mother's death, and her family is torn by suspicion and grief.  Was her mother's death an accident?

Cast
 Adrian Dunbar as Dr Jim Hogan
 Carolina Main as Cathleen "Cat" Hogan
 Gráinne Keenan as Fiona Hogan
 Diarmuid Noyes as Michael Hogan
 Ingrid Craigie as Mary Hogan
 Fiona Bell as Gillian Mooney
 Denis Conway as Tom Mooney
 Desmond Eastwood as Owen Mooney
 Ian Lloyd Anderson as Paul Crowley
 Ruby Dunne as Rose Crowley
 James Heffernan as Joseph Crowley
 Sean Duggan as Dez Breen
 Shereen Martin as Sarah

Production
Blood was filmed in Meath, Kildare, and Dublin. The location of the family home was at the Larchill Arcadian Gardens in County Meath.

Series overview

Series 1 (2018)

Series 2 (2020)

Indian Adaptation
On March 28, 2022, it was announced Disney+ Hotstar would produce an Indian adaptation of Blood. The series, titled Masoom, is helmed by Gurmmeet Singh and is set to debut on June 17, 2022.

References

External links

2018 Irish television series debuts
2010s Irish television series
2020s Irish television series
Irish crime television series
Irish drama television series
English-language television shows
Virgin Media Television (Ireland) original programming